Cathy Bennett is a Canadian businesswomen and politician in Newfoundland and Labrador, Canada. She represented the electoral district of Virginia Waters in the Newfoundland and Labrador House of Assembly from 2014 to 2018.

Bennett was first elected in a 2014 by-election to succeed former Premier Kathy Dunderdale, who had resigned earlier in the year. She defeated her Progressive Conservative opponent by 40 votes.

In 2013, Bennett ran for the leadership of the Liberal Party, coming in third. She served as Minister of Finance in the Ball government.

Background
Bennett received a High School diploma in 1982.

Bennett is a prominent business person in Newfoundland, owning and operating numerous restaurants throughout the province. She was also a significant contributor and fundraiser for St. John's first Ronald McDonald House. Bennett previously served as the chairperson of the St. John's Board of Trade and governor of the Atlantic Provinces Economic Council.

Politics

Minister of Finance
Bennett became Minister of Finance for the provincial government after the Liberal Party won 31 out of 40 seats in the 2015 general election. She was re-elected in the district of Windsor Lake.

On April 14, 2016 Bennett revealed the provincial government's budget which implements austerity measures. She criticized the high amount of spending by the government from 2003-15 led by the Progressive Conservative Party.

Bennett resigned as Finance Minister on July 31, 2017. Bennett continued as a backbencher MHA from July 2017 until August 2018; most notably her involvement in the debate regarding bullying and harassment in the House of Assembly. She resigned on August 21, 2018.

Abuse in office

In a 2016 article in the National Observer, Bennett shared that she faces body-shaming and abuse from disappointed constituents. Some of these constituents offered that the best solution to her policy would be kill herself or "All Newfoundlanders should put a bounty on her head. She is a witch." She is quoted saying,"Language that starts with the shaming and the insults and the verbal abuse is the beginning steps that lead to [physical violence]." In 2018, following the suspension of two cabinet ministers for harassment, Bennett stated that her resignation as Finance Minister in 2017 was due to bullying, isolation and gaslighting within the Liberal caucus and cabinet.

Awards and honors 
2013 CEO of the Year - Atlantic Business Magazine 

2012 Top 25 Women of Influence

Electoral record 

}
|-

|-

|align="right"|1892
|align="right"|39.05
|align="right"|-20.99
|-

|NDP
|Sheilagh O'Leary
|align="right"|1021
|align="right"|21.07
|align="right"|-9.35

|}

References

External links

Living people
Women government ministers of Canada
Liberal Party of Newfoundland and Labrador MHAs
People from Corner Brook
Politicians from St. John's, Newfoundland and Labrador
Members of the Executive Council of Newfoundland and Labrador
21st-century Canadian politicians
1964 births
Finance ministers of Newfoundland and Labrador
Female finance ministers
21st-century Canadian women politicians